The Great River (Jamaica) is one of Jamaica's major rivers, and forms the boundary of the parish of St James with Westmoreland and Hanover.

Course
The Great River rises at about  just north of the small village of Pisgah in the north west corner of St Elizabeth.

Ecology
The Great River is home to the second largest tree in the island, and to crawfish.

Tourism
The Great River is one of the three most popular for traditional rafting on bamboo rafts. It is also used for tube and zip line craft.

See also
List of rivers of Jamaica

References

Ford, Jos C. and Finlay, A.A.C. (1908).The Handbook of Jamaica. Jamaica Government Printing Office

External links
Aerial view of the mouth of the Great River
Aerial view of the headwaters of the Great River

Rivers of Jamaica